Jenna-Louise Coleman (born 27 April 1986), known professionally as Jenna Coleman, is an English actress. She is known for her roles as Jasmine Thomas in the soap opera Emmerdale, Clara Oswald in the science-fiction series Doctor Who, Queen Victoria in the period drama Victoria, Joanna Lindsay in the crime miniseries The Cry, and Marie-Andrée Leclerc in the crime miniseries The Serpent. She has also had roles in several films, including Captain America: The First Avenger (2011), and Me Before You (2016). In 2022, she portrayed Johanna Constantine in the Netflix fantasy drama series The Sandman.

Early life
Jenna-Louise Coleman was born in Blackpool on 27 April 1986, the daughter of Karen and Keith Coleman. Her father is a joiner and fitter of bar and restaurant interiors. She has an older brother named Ben, also a joiner. Coleman is of English, Scottish, Welsh and Irish ancestry. Her grandmother reportedly named her after the character of Jenna Wade from the American TV series Dallas. 

She attended Arnold School in Blackpool, where she was head girl. While at school, she was a member of the theatre company In Yer Space, with whom she performed in the play Crystal Clear at the Edinburgh Festival. She won an award for her performance, and the play was also received favourably. She was offered a place to study English at the University of York, but turned it down in order to accept the role of Jasmine Thomas in the soap opera Emmerdale.

Career

2005–2012: Early career 

Coleman landed the part of Jasmine Thomas in Emmerdale in 2005. At the British Soap Awards 2007, she was nominated for the "Best Newcomer" award, and at the National Television Awards 2006, she was nominated for the "Most Popular Newcomer" award. At the 2009 British Soap Awards, she was nominated for the "Best Actress", "Sexiest Female", and "Best Dramatic Performance" awards. She received a nomination for the "Best Actress" award from the TV Choice Awards. In May 2009, it was announced that Coleman would be joining BBC school-based drama series, Waterloo Road, as "hard girl" Lindsay James. As she was 23 at the time of her casting, Coleman found the experience of playing a schoolgirl "surreal".

Following Waterloo Road, Coleman spent time in the United States auditioning for roles, in 2011 making it to final auditions for a sitcom pilot that she had to back out of in order to take a role in Titanic (see below).  

In December 2010, it was announced that Coleman would be playing Susan Brown in a BBC Four television adaptation of the John Braine novel Room at the Top. The adaptation was originally intended to air in April 2011, but this was cancelled due to a rights dispute between the production company and Braine's estate. The dispute was resolved by 2012, and the show aired in two parts on 26 and 27 September 2012. In 2011, she made her feature film debut with a small role in Captain America: The First Avenger. She also got the role of Annie Desmond in Julian Fellowes' four part mini-series Titanic, describing her character as a "cheeky little Cockney" and "the Eliza Doolittle of the ship".

She starred as Lydia Wickham in the adaptation of Death Comes to Pemberley. The three episodes were shown on BBC One during Christmas 2013.

In 2012, Coleman was cast as Rosie in Stephen Poliakoff's original drama series Dancing on the Edge, which follows the fortunes of a black jazz band in the 1930s. The show aired on BBC Two in February 2013.

2012–2017: Doctor Who 
On 21 March 2012, Doctor Who producer Steven Moffat confirmed at a press conference that Coleman would play the companion of the Eleventh Doctor (Matt Smith). Moffat chose her for the role because she worked the best alongside Smith and could talk faster than he could. She auditioned for the role in secret, under the pretence of auditioning for Men on Waves (an anagram for "Woman Seven": she would first appear in the show's seventh series).

Although originally announced as beginning her run as companion in the Christmas special in 2012, Coleman made a surprise appearance on 1 September 2012 in the first episode of the seventh series as Oswin Oswald, a guest character. Coleman subsequently debuted as a series regular in the Christmas special episode "The Snowmen" as Victorian governess and barmaid Clara Oswin Oswald. In that episode, Coleman also played a third version of the character, a resident of twenty-first-century London simply named Clara Oswald. Beginning in "The Bells of Saint John", this version begins her travels as the Doctor's regular companion, including after his regeneration into the Twelfth Doctor, played by Peter Capaldi, in the 2013 Christmas special episode "The Time of the Doctor." In the 2014 Christmas special episode "Last Christmas", it was revealed that Coleman would remain in the role of Clara for Series 9. However, the ninth series was her last, as Coleman had decided to leave the show to take on a role as Queen Victoria in an ITV production.

She returned to the show for Twelfth Doctor's last episode "Twice Upon a Time" where she made a cameo appearance; that episode, Doctor Who 2017 Christmas special, aired the same evening as the first Christmas special for Victoria. She was first credited on screen as Jenna Coleman in Doctor Who Live: The Next Doctor, which aired on 4 August 2013.

2015–present: Victoria, The Cry, The Serpent and The Sandman

In 2015, Coleman was cast in ITV's eight-part drama following the reign of the British monarch and Empress of India, Queen Victoria. The actress confessed that she was not fully informed about Victorian history, but researched the role. When interviewed for BBC Radio 4's Woman's Hour, Coleman expressed her admiration for the monarch. She argued that this role meant she was able to break out of her supposed "box" as a northern working-class character that Emmerdale put her in. Victoria premiered on 28 August 2016 on ITV, and in September 2016, ITV renewed Victoria for a second series. A Christmas special for 2017 was also commissioned and a third series was announced in December 2017.

In 2017, Coleman became the narrator for a Royal Caribbean UK advertising campaign. On 8 January 2018, Coleman was confirmed to play Joanna in the four-part BBC drama The Cry, an adaptation of the 2013 novel by Helen FitzGerald.

In 2019, Coleman starred as Annie in the Old Vic Theatre's production of All My Sons, which ran from 13 April to 8 June and included a cinema screening via National Theatre Live on 14 May. In February 2019, it was announced that Coleman would make a guest appearance in an episode from series five of the dark comedy series Inside No. 9, with an expected broadcast date later in the year. Series five returned to the screen on 3 February 2020.

On 11 May 2019, in an interview with Graham Norton on his BBC Radio 2 program, Coleman indicated her intent to return to Victoria for a fourth series should it be renewed by ITV, but stated that the show will be taking "a bit of a breather" before production resumes. In the same year 2019, Coleman was selected for the role of Marie-Andrée Leclerc in the Netflix and BBC drama The Serpent, a dramatisation of the life of convicted serial killer Charles Sobhraj. Production of The Serpent began in Bangkok in September 2019 and continued into 2020, with an expected BBC broadcast later in the year. As with most other film and television production, work on The Serpent was suspended in March 2020 due to the COVID-19 pandemic. Filming resumed on 17 August in the UK and was completed on 28 August. Due to the delay in filming, the broadcast date for The Serpent was moved to 2021. It premiered on 1 January 2021 on BBC One.

During the pandemic, Coleman participated in The Remote Read, a planned series of online drama performances to raise funds for theatrical workers left unemployed by the pandemic. The first production under this banner, an adaptation of Tom Stoppard's A Separate Peace (1966), was transmitted via the Zoom videoconferencing platform on 2 May 2020. Coleman also recorded the short story Pressures, Residential by Philip Hensher, in support of UNICEF UK, as well as The Tale of the Flopsy Bunnies by Beatrix Potter, as part of a collection of audiobooks in Beatrix Potter: The Complete Tales.

Nine years after its original English release, Coleman reprised her role as Princess Melia Antiqua in the video game Xenoblade Chronicles: Definitive Edition, which features a brand new epilogue taking place after the main story. She then returned as Melia in Xenoblade Chronicles 3 in 2022, where she is depicted as Queen of the Keves Nation.

Coleman headed Boots UK's 2021 Christmas ad campaign, "Bags of Joy". Her character, Joy, is shown to give Christmas presents to friends and family out of a bag that is bigger on the inside.

In May 2021, Coleman was cast as Johanna Constantine, the great-great-great-grandmother of John Constantine in DC Comics' The Sandman TV series. The series debuted on Netflix in August 2022, when it was revealed that Coleman was playing two roles in the film; the aforementioned version of Johanna and her present day descendant of the same name. This new interpretation led to calls for a spin-off series. Although such a project has yet to be announced as of late 2022, Coleman is expected to reprise the role in the series' second season.

Coleman returned to the West End stage beginning in January 2023, co-starring with Aidan Turner in a revival of the 2015 Sam Steiner play, Lemons Lemons Lemons Lemons Lemons, initially with a nine-week run at the Harold Pinter Theatre in London, followed by runs in Manchester and Brighton up until April.

Upcoming projects 
In February 2021, Coleman was cast in the dark comedy Klokkenluider. Filming began on 28 February in East Sussex, for a three-week shoot in a COVID-secure "bubble". The film was announced as having its public debut at the 2022 London Film Festival on 8 October 2022. 

It was later announced that she was cast for the lead role of Joan Bright and would be the executive producer of the historical drama series The War Rooms, which will tell the story of the women who worked in Winston Churchill's secret Whitehall bunker during World War II and inspired Ian Fleming to create the character of Miss Moneypenny for his James Bond novels. As of September 2022, no further announcements regarding this proposed series have been made, though Coleman stated during convention appearances in the fall of 2022 that it was still in pre-production.

In June 2022, Coleman was announced to play Liv Taylor in the Amazon prime thriller Wilderness, based on B.E. Jones' novel of the same name, with filming beginning in British Columbia in early summer 2022.

Just prior to Christmas 2022, Coleman filmed a role in a film directed by Jamie Childs entitled Jackdaw; widely reported on social media, Coleman did not confirm her involvement until an interview published in late January 2023.

Charity work
Coleman has been involved with charity work in South Africa raising awareness of HIV with One To One Children's Fund, for which she is an ambassador. She is also an ambassador for Place2Be, a charity providing emotional and therapeutic services in schools. Coleman has also regularly supported Comic Relief and Red Nose Day.

Filmography

Film

Television

Stage

Video games

Audio

Awards and nominations

Notes

References

External links

 

1986 births
English television actresses
Living people
People educated at Arnold School
People from Blackpool
21st-century English actresses
English soap opera actresses
English stage actresses
English video game actresses
English voice actresses
Actresses from Lancashire
Logie Award winners